Balandougouba may refer to:

Balandougouba, Mandiana, Guinea
Balandougouba, Siguiri, Guinea